In telecommunication, the term electronic deception means the deliberate radiation, reradiation, alteration, suppression, absorption, denial, enhancement, or reflection of electromagnetic energy in a manner intended to convey misleading information and to deny valid information to an enemy or to enemy electronics-dependent weapons.

Among the types of electronic deception are:
Manipulative electronic deception – Actions to eliminate revealing or convey misleading, telltale indicators that may be used by hostile forces
Simulative electronic deception – Actions to represent friendly notional or actual capabilities to mislead hostile forces
Imitative electronic deception – The introduction of electromagnetic energy into enemy systems that imitates enemy emissions.

See also
Simulated reality

References

Deception